The Boyanska reka ("Boyana river") is a river in western Bulgaria, a left tributary to the river Perlovska.

The river flows from the northern slopes of Cherni Vrah in Vitosha Mountain, crossing Torfeno Branishte Nature Reserve; at the northern foothills of Vitosha the river drops abruptly forming the Boyana waterfall and then crosses the village of Boyana (suburb of Sofia, from which the river takes its name) to flow through various neighborhoods of the capital Sofia, partially underneath the city, to finally flow into Perlovska river, near the National Palace of Culture, in the central part of Sofia.

Rivers of Bulgaria
Geography of Sofia
Landforms of Sofia City Province
Vitosha